Miguel Ángel Neira Pincheira (born October 9, 1952) is a retired football midfielder from Chile, who represented his native country at the 1982 FIFA World Cup, wearing the number twenty jersey.

He played club football for O'Higgins, Unión Española and Club Deportivo Universidad Católica in Chile. For his native country he was capped 45 times, scoring 4 goals between 1976 and 1985, and making his debut on October 6, 1976 in a friendly match against Uruguay.

Championships

National championships

Other championships

Friendly championships

References
 
 Weltfussball profile 

1952 births
Chilean footballers
Unión Española footballers
Club Deportivo Universidad Católica footballers
Association football midfielders
Chile international footballers
1982 FIFA World Cup players
1979 Copa América players
Living people
O'Higgins F.C. footballers
People from Concepción Province, Chile